Araby Lockhart (born December 4, 1926) is a Canadian stage and television actress, best known for her performances in the films Capote and Police Academy  and her stage performances as a member of Hart House Theatre and the Straw Hat Players. Lockhart has also served as President of the Actors' Fund of Canada.

Biography 
Lockhart became interested in acting as a teenager and attended the University of Toronto in 1947, where she acted at Hart House Theatre under artistic director Robert Gill. She also accompanied Gill to act in summer stock theatre in Woodstock, New York. In the summer of 1948, Gill's students Murray and Donald Davis founded the Straw Hat Players repertory theatre company at their summer home in Port Carling, Muskoka; Lockhart was a member of the company and acted in the company's first production of the melodrama The Drunkard, along with classmates Charmion King, Ted Follows, and Eric House. While at Hart House, she met John Gray, an aspiring writer and actor, and they married in 1952.

Lockhart also toured Canada with the show Spare Rib, showcasing the history of Canada as told and performed by women, in 1955 and served as a member of the Stratford Festival company.

In 1960, Lockhart, Gray and their three children, John, Nicholas, and Rebecca, moved to London to find work in the vital West End theatre scene. Lockhart produced and performed in the Canadian satirical revue Clap Hands, co-written by Gray, at the Prince Charles Theatre and the Lyric Hammersmith, along with Peter Mews, and Eric House. While in London, the couple had two more children, Susannah and Felix.

Gray and Lockhart divorced in 1983.

Film and television performances

Bibliography 
"Araby Lockhart." IMDb. IMDb.com, n.d. Web. 7 June 2017. <http://www.imdb.com/name/nm0516863/?ref_=nm_wrk>.

Nothof, Anne. "Straw Hat Players." Canadian Theatre Encyclopedia. N.p., 14 Sept. 2016. Web. 7 June 2017. <http://www.canadiantheatre.com/dict.pl?term=Straw%20Hat%20Players>.

"Obituary of John Gray." The Globe and Mail. N.p., 04 Mar. 2017. Web. 7 June 2017.

References/Notes and references

External links 
Interview with Theatre Museum Canada

1926 births
Living people
Actresses from Toronto
Canadian stage actresses
Canadian television actresses